Tiny Tim was an American Sunday strip created by Stanley Link. It ran from October 4, 1931, to March 2, 1958. It followed the adventures of Tim Grunt and his sister Dotty, both only two inches tall at the start of the strip. However, they grew six inches during the first three months. After that, they were taken in by a farm couple. 

Eventually, a gypsy grew them to slightly less than normal size, and Dotty disappeared. On April 13, 1941, the gypsy gave Tim an amulet that said "Nemesis of All Evil". By saying the words out loud, Tim could return to being two inches tall, then grow back to normal size. In 1957, Link died, and on March 2, 1958, the strip ended.  Tiny Tim was once popular, but has since faded into obscurity.

References

American comic strips
1931 comics debuts
Fictional American people
Fantasy comics
American comics characters
Male characters in comics
Shapeshifter characters in comics
1958 comics endings